The Nokia 6103 is a mobile phone based on the Nokia Series 40 platform and the Nokia 6103 builds upon the popularity of the 6101. It features a TFT display supports up to 65,536 colors (128 x 160 pixels).The phone also has a secondary external mini display that supports up to 4,096 colors (96 x 65 pixels). More key features include Bluetooth wireless technology, FM radio and camera.

The 6103 has tri-band GSM coverage and operates on GSM 850/1800/1900 MHz or GSM 900/1800/1900 MHz depending on the region.

The 6103's camera is a VGA camera (resolution 640 x 480 pixels) good enough for taking snapshots with, but in no way is it an alternative to even the cheapest digital cameras.

The phone can be controlled via PC to send SMS messages, perform synchronization with Outlook, install Java apps, and more using the Nokia PC Suite. Though Nokia 6103 had been released in 2006, People are still using this phone.

See also  
 List of Nokia products

References

6103
Mobile phones introduced in 2006